Kazumasa Hirai is the name of:

 Kazumasa Hirai (author) (1938–2015), novelist
 Kazumasa Hirai (weightlifter) (born 1949), Olympic bronze medalist